Radkovka is a rural locality (a selo) and the administrative center of Radkovskoye Rural Settlement, Prokhorovsky District, Belgorod Oblast, Russia. The population was 1,024 as of 2010. There are 13 streets.

Geography 
Radkovka is located 22 km northeast of Prokhorovka (the district's administrative centre) by road. Petrovka is the nearest rural locality.

References 

Rural localities in Prokhorovsky District
Korochansky Uyezd